Aana Alaralodalaral is a 2017 Malayalam language Comedy film produced by Poetry Film House. The film is directed by Dileep Mohan, and stars Vineeth Sreenivasan and Anu Sithara in the lead roles along with Suraj Venjaramood, Innocent, Vijayaraghavan and Hareesh Perumanna. The music is composed by Shaan Rahman. The film is based on a story written by Sarath Balan.

Plot 
The story revolves around Shekarankutty the new elephant bought by Padmanabhan Thampi. The whole village is excited to be around the animal. Then the atmosphere changes as Hashim, comrade Jalaludin's son, is accused of stealing Shekarankutty's  golden 'elas'. Velayudhan uses this opportunity to seek vengeance against his enemy Jalaludhin by accusing Hashim. The situation forces Jalaludin and family to flee. Later, the situation changes and Shekarankutty is disowned by Thampi and is handed over to Hashim who returns to the village to claim ownership. Hashim and Parvaty, Thampi's daughter, have a love affair. The ownership of the elephant gets exchanged to different people from different religions. At last, a situation arises such that Shekarankutty himself has to choose his real owner. Later the story comes to an end picturing the acts people do in the name of religion.

Cast 

Vineeth Sreenivasan as Hashim
Anu Sithara as Parvathy
Suraj Venjaramoodu as Velayudhan
Dileep as Shekharankutty (voice) 
Vishak Nair as Achootty
Thezni Khan as Hajara Beevi
Innocent as Pathrose
Vijayaraghavan as Stalin Prabhakaran
 Hareesh Perumanna as Dasharathan
Bijukuttan as Eenasu's Assistant
Dharmajan Bolgatty as Inzamam Imran Khan
 Trichur Elsi as Plamena
 Vinod Kedamangalam as Ponnappan
Saju Kodiyan as Black Magician
Mammukoya as Ibrahim
 Srikant Murali as Jamaludeen
 Murugan  as Panicker
 Priyankb as Black Magician
 Sreejith Ravi as Eenasu
 Naseer Sankranthi as Kunji Pokker
 Manju Sunichen as Kunji Pokker's Wife
 Manju Vani as Snehalatha
 Manjusha Sajish

Soundtrack 
The music is composed by ShaanRahman along with Vineeth Sreenivasan, Mithun Jayaraj and others

 "Shekara" – Sreya Jayadeep, Vidhu Prathap
 "Sunnath kalyanam" – Gowry Lekshmi, Mithun Jayaraj
 "Neeyum Njanum" – Sachin Balu
 "Sthothram" – Biju James
 "Shaanthi" – Vineeth Sreenivasan

References

External links

2017 films
2010s Malayalam-language films
Films scored by Shaan Rahman
Indian comedy films
2017 comedy films